Oxbacken is a former locality situated in Nyköping Municipality, Södermanland County, Sweden with 220 inhabitants in 2005. Since 2010 it is included statistically in Nyköping urban area.

References 

Populated places in Södermanland County